Chrysochares asiaticus is a species of beetles belonging to the leaf beetle family, subfamily Eumolpinae.

Description
Its prototum is green or greenish-blue, while the elytra are purple-red, or sometimes blue with a green sheen. The tips of the antennae are black.

Distribution
C. asiaticus is distributed in Azerbaijan, southern European Russia, central Asia, Afghanistan, Mongolia, and Xinjiang (an autonomous region of China).

References

 Zipcodezoo Species Identifier

External links
 Biol.uni
 Zin.ru

Eumolpinae
Taxa named by Peter Simon Pallas
Beetles described in 1771
Beetles of Asia
Insects of Azerbaijan
Insects of Afghanistan
Insects of Central Asia
Insects of China
Insects of Mongolia
Insects of Russia